Pete Philly & Perquisite  was a hip hop duo  from Amsterdam, Netherlands consisting of Pedro Philip Monzón  (born May 28, 1980 in Aruba) as the MC/vocalist and Pieter "Perquisite" Perquin  (born 1982 in Amsterdam) as the cellist, producer and composer of all the music. Their music is best described as hip hop with influences from jazz, broken beat and soul. They usually performed live together with DJ PCM (Misha van der Winkel), Remco Keijzer on saxophone, EWI and flute, Kasper Kalf on double-bass and Ruben Hein on keys.

Mindstate
Pete Philly and Perquisite both had musical careers before they met in the autumn of 2002. Pete Philly was part of funk formation Gotcha! and hip-hop group Nicotine and in 2002 took part as a solo performer in the 'Grote Prijs van Nederland' where he won the award for best musician. Perquisite released two solo EP's (2001 & 2002) on his own label Unexpected Records on which he worked with jazz musicians like Benjamin Herman (nl) and David Kweksilber. Pete & Perq decided to collaborate and in January 2004 their first EP The Mindstate EP was released. The EP received a lot of critical acclaim which stimulated Pete Philly & Perquisite to create a full album out of the original EP. Each track of the album would represent a certain state of mind, hence the title Mindstate. The actual writing, recording and producing of the much anticipated album took about a year, and included collaborations with fellow Dutch rapper Cee-Major (The Proov), Dutch singer Senna Gourdou and American rapper Talib Kweli.

The debut album was internationally considered by critics as one of the best albums ever to come out of the Netherlands.  In March 2005 the album was released in Japan through Unexpected Records / Handcuts Records and in April it was released all over Europe through Unexpected Records / Epitaph Europe.
The duo did create a very solid fanbase with performances with their live formation across Europe and also in the USA and South Africa. Success rose because of their performances and hitsongs like Mellow and Grateful. Their success led them to winning an Essent Award and a Zilveren Harp. They were also nominated for a Dutch MOBO-award, three TMF awards, the MTV European Music Award and for the prestigious Edison-award.
On August 20, 2006 they performed at the A Campingflight to Lowlands Paradise-festival for the second time, this time performing with the New Generation Big Band. In September of that same year they finished the Mindstate tour in a sold out Melkweg, Amsterdam.

Remindstate
After the last show of the Mindstate tour Pete & Perq took a break to work on their second album. During this non-touring period 'Remindstate' was released, the totally remixed version of the Mindstate album. The record, which was released January 2007, included remixes from several musical friends of the duo like Seiji, Bugz in the Attic, Nicolay, C-Mon & Kypski, Morgan Spacek, Laidback Luke and the Metropole Orchestra and was well received by both the audience and press.

Mystery Repeats
In September 2007 the second album, Mystery Repeats, was released in the Netherlands through Unexpected Records / ANTI Records. A Belgium release followed on January 21, 2008, the European release on February 18 and the Japanese release (through Handcuts Records) on March 5, 2008. The album entered on the first position in the Dutch album charts in the week of its release and the first single 'Time Flies' received a lot of radio- and airplay, especially in the Netherlands. Pete & Perq started their live tour in a sold out Melkweg again and started to play all over Europe. In March 2008 they toured around Japan and in April of that same year they toured together with Leeroy from Saian Supa Crew in Germany. In the summer of 2008 they played at well known festivals across Europe including Sziget (HU), Nuke (AT), Exit  (SR), Lowlands (NL), HipHop Open (DE), North Sea Jazz (NL), Printemps de Bourges (FR), Gurtenfestival (CH) and Summerjam (DE). When they got back they received the prestigious 'Amsterdam Award of Art', the most important award of the city, presented by the Amsterdam mayor, Job Cohen. At this time their third single 'Mystery Repeats' entered the Dutch Top 40 staying in there about a month and became their most successful single to date. They were also nominated for the second time for an MTV European Music Award.

Final Celebration Tour
In 2008 Pete & Perq embarked on another tour across Europe. The first three shows were all sold out as were many of the others. They finished their European tour in Amsterdam pop venue Paradiso on December 6 that same year. After more than 300 shows including supporting acts for artists like James Brown and Kanye West, the duo ended their partnership in the Autumn of 2009 with their 'Final Celebration Tour'.

Awards and nominations
2005
 Mindstate ‘Disque Pop de la Semaine’ (VPRO radio)
 Winner Essent Award
 Nominated for Best Album of the year by 3voor12ists of the full English name of the current month with initial capital, a space, and the year, not full dates; e.g., "January 2013", but not "jan13". Any deviation from these two rules will result in an "invalid date parameter" error.
 Nominated for 2 Dutch Mobo Awards: Best Live Act and Best Album

2006
 Winner Silver Harp (Zilveren Harp)
 Winner Kink FM Live XS Award: Best New Live Act
 Nominated for 2 Edisons: Best Group and Best New Group
 Nominated for 3 3FM Awards: Best Artist R&B & HipHop, Best Album and Best New Artist
 Nominated for TMF Awards: Best New Artist
 Nominated for MTV European Music Award: Best Dutch/Belgian Act (Other nominees: Kane, Deus, Anouk, Gabriel Rios)
 Nominated for Urban Awards: Best Live Act
 Nominated for Party Peeps 2000 Awards: Best Live Act
 Winner of the Gouden Greep 2006 for Most Original Collaboration and nominated for Best Group and Best Live Act

2007
 Nominated for 2 Urban Awards: Best Album & Best Live Act
 Nominated for 6 Gouden Grepen: Best Group, Best Album, Best Live Act, Best Song, Best Video, Best Producer

2008
 Nominated for Gouden Notenkraker: Music
 Nominated for 3FM Awards: Best Artist Alternative
 Winner of the Amsterdamprijs voor de Kunst
 Nominated for MTV Europe Music Award
 Nominated for three State Awards: Best Group, Best Live Act & Best Single

Discography

External links 
 
 Official MySpace
 History of Pete Philly & Perquisite from Dutch Rock and Pop Institute
 Pete Philly Interview on GermanRhymes.de

Dutch rappers
Dutch hip hop groups
Dutch people of Aruban descent
Anti- (record label) artists
P-Vine Records artists
Epitaph Records artists